Luis Fernández (born 20 January 1997) is a Spanish slalom canoeist who has competed at the international level since 2014.

He won a silver medal in the C1 team event at the 2019 ICF Canoe Slalom World Championships in La Seu d'Urgell. He also won a bronze medal in the same event at the 2022 European Championships in Liptovský Mikuláš.

References

External links

Living people
Spanish male canoeists
1997 births
Medalists at the ICF Canoe Slalom World Championships
21st-century Spanish people